RPM was a Canadian magazine that published the best-performing singles of Canada from 1964 to 2000. In 1998, fifteen songs peaked at number one on the magazine's chart. Chumbawamba's "Tubthumping" was the first chart-topper of the year while Canadian musician Alanis Morissette stayed at number one into 1999 with "Thank U". Seven musical acts attained their first Canadian number one this year: Matchbox Twenty, Natalie Imbruglia, Fastball, Goo Goo Dolls, Brandy, Monica, and Jennifer Paige. Two artists reached number one with more than one single: Bryan Adams and Goo Goo Dolls.

The most successful song of the year, as well as the longest-running number-one hit, was "Torn" by Australian singer Natalie Imbruglia, which spent 12 nonconsecutive weeks at number one from April to July, interrupted on the week of 15 June by Fastball's "The Way". Two other songs also interrupted a single's reign at number one: "3 AM" by Matchbox Twenty kept Bryan Adams' "Back to You" off number one for two weeks, and "Iris" by Goo Goo Dolls lost the number-one position on the issue of 17 August to Brandy and Monica's "The Boy Is Mine".

Three Canadian artists reached number one during 1998: Bryan Adams, Celine Dion, and Alanis Morissette. Dion topped the chart for six weeks with "My Heart Will Go On". Besides "Torn" and "My Heart Will Go On", five songs stayed at the summit for at least three weeks: "Back to You" by Bryan Adams, "Iris" by Goo Goo Dolls, "Crush" by Jennifer Paige, "Sweetest Thing" by U2, and "Thank U" by Alanis Morissette. Goo Goo Dolls' "Slide" became only the third single to debut at number one on the RPM Singles Chart, not counting the magazine's first issue.

Chart history

Notes

See also
1998 in music

List of Billboard Hot 100 number ones of 1998 (United States)
List of number-one singles from the 1990s (New Zealand)

References

External links
 Read about RPM Magazine at the AV Trust
 Search RPM charts here at Library and Archives Canada

 
1998 record charts
1998